Andrey Kabanov (born 2 March 1977) is a Russian bandy player with Belarusian descent. Therefore his national team is Belarus. He has been playing in a number of club teams, since 2013 for Lokomotiv Orenburg. In the 2015 Bandy World Championship he was the top scorer.

References

External links
 
 

1977 births
Living people
Belarusian bandy players
Lokomotiv Orenburg players